The Insiders Guide To Love is a New Zealand drama series directed by Brendan Donovan which went to air on TVNZ from 2005 to 2006.

Plot

The series explores the lives of a group of seven previously unconnected people. Each is implicated in a bizarre incident, the outcome of which forces them to examine and explore the loves in their own lives.  The series is a prequel to the show The Insider's Guide To Happiness, with James the only character in common.

Cast
Will Hall - James
Gareth Reeves - Luc
Louis Sutherland - Marty
Kate Elliott - Nicole
Ryan O'Kane - Brad
Serena Cotton - Rachel
Yvette Reid - Maxine
Camille Keenan - Asha

Episode Listing
 Fallen in Love Lately?
 Can Love Make You Sick?
 Is Love An Illusion?
 Would You Love Me If I Was Different?
 Can You Accept Love?
 Who Taught You to Love?
 The Power of Love

External links
 (archived 2008)

TVNZ (archived 2005)

2005 New Zealand television series debuts
Insider's Guide To Love
Insider's Guide To Love
TVNZ original programming
Television shows funded by NZ on Air